A horticultural industry is an organization devoted to the study and culture of cultivated plants.  Such organizations may be local, regional, national, or international.  Some have a more general focus, whereas others are devoted to a particular kind or group of plants. They are also clustered.

The oldest horticultural society in the world, founded in 1768, is the Ancient Society of York Florists. They still have four shows a year in York, UK.
They have a large archive of records, including the original members book dating back to 1768.

Notable organization 
 Cactus and Succulent Society of America
 Royal Horticultural Society
 American Horticultural Society

See also
Horticulture

References

External links
 Horticultural Society of New York